HMS Sylph was an  destroyer that served in the Royal Navy during the First World War. The R class were an improvement on the previous M class with geared steam turbines to improve efficiency. Launched by Harland & Wolff at Govan on 10 February 1917, Sylph joined the Harwich Force and escorted merchant ships and convoys in the North Sea. The ship encountered both German submarines and torpedo boats but did not record any hits on the enemy. However, during one action in foggy weather, the destroyer struck and sank sister ship . After the Armistice that ended the war, the destroyer was initially placed in the reserve before being transferred to the Torpedo School in 1919. On 16 December 1926, Sylph was sold to be broken up.

Design and development

Sylph was one of 17  ordered by the British Admiralty as part of the Sixth War Programme in July 1915. The design was generally similar to the preceding M class, but differed in having geared steam turbines, the aft gun mounted on a raised platform and minor changes to improve seakeeping.

Three funnels were fitted.

Armament consisted of three QF 4in Mk IV guns on the ship's centreline, with one on the forecastle, one aft on a raised platform and one between the second and third funnels. A single 2-pounder (40 mm) pom-pom anti-aircraft gun was carried, while torpedo armament consisted of two twin mounts for  torpedoes.The ship had a complement of 82 officers and ratings.

Construction and career
Laid down by Harland & Wolff at their shipyard in Govan on 30 August 1916, Sylph was launched on 15 November 1916 and completed on 10 February 1917. The destroyer was the seventh to be named after sylph, an elemental spirit of the air in Rosicrucianism. Sylph was deployed as part of the Harwich Force, joining the Tenth Destroyer Flotilla.

Sylph was deployed as an escort for convoys which crossed the North Sea. On 5 March, along with the M-class destroyer , Sylph was escorting the fast steamer  when a torpedo was spotted, which struck the passenger ship on the port side. Sylph drew alongside and rescued 47 survivors before the ship sank. On 17 May, Sylph and sister ship  left Harwich at the head of two divisions of destroyers escorting a convoy of more than a dozen merchant ships in foggy weather. Sylph saw faint lights to the north and, assessing them as enemy vessels, steamed towards them. A confused fight ensued and Sylph narrowly missed the German ships, but hit the starboard quarter of the destroyer . Despite attempts to save the ship, Setter was lost. The crew boarded Sylph and, one hour and twenty minutes after being rammed, the ship sank. One merchant ship from the convoy, was sunk by the German warships.

After the Armistice of 11 November 1918 that ended the war, the navy needed to move to a peacetime level of mobilisation. Both the number of ships and the amount of staff were reduced to save money. Sylph was transferred to join sixty-three other destroyers in reserve at Nore. The destroyer was recommissioned on 1 October 1919 and joined the Torpedo School. In 1923, the Navy decided to scrap many of the older destroyers in preparation for the introduction of newer and larger vessels. It was then decided that Sylph would be one of these to be retired. The destroyer was sold to Cashmore of Newport, Wales, on 16 December 1926. Stranded on 28 January the following year, the ship was broken up instead at Aberavon.

Pennant numbers

References

Citations

Bibliography

 
 
 
 
 
 
 
 
 
 
 
 

1917 ships
R-class destroyers (1916)
Ships built on the River Clyde
World War I destroyers of the United Kingdom